Geeuwenbrug is a village in the Dutch province of Drenthe. It is a part of the municipality of Westerveld, and lies about 18 km north of Hoogeveen.

The village was first mentioned in 1617 or 1618 as "die Crumme voerdt offt guijwe", and means bridge over a waterway, and refers to the former river Lake which was used to transport peat. The village started to develop along the canal after 1850.

References

Populated places in Drenthe
Westerveld